Hoseynabad (also Romanized as Ḩoseynābād; also known as Hosein Abad Khodabandehloo and Husainābād) is a village in Khararud Rural District, in the Central District of Khodabandeh County, Zanjan Province, Iran. At the 2006 census, its population was 452, in 96 families.

References 

Populated places in Khodabandeh County